The Castle is a 1964 Danish family film directed by Anker Sørensen and starring Malene Schwartz.

Cast
Malene Schwartz as Bente Falke
Poul Reichhardt as Henrik Stenfeldt
Lone Hertz as Mariann Falke
Mimi Heinrich as Regitse
Henning Palner as Bill
Olaf Ussing as Kammerherren
Bodil Steen as Husholderske Madsen
Inge Ketti as Stuepigen Nelly
Karl Stegger as A.H. Jessen
Hannah Bjarnhof as Iversen
Preben Mahrt as Fætter Hans
Preben Neergaard as Konrad Jørling
Ole Monty as Butler Thomas
Bent Vejlby as Østergaard
Bjørn Puggaard-Müller as Grossereren
Eigil Reimers as Fabrikant
Knud Hallest as Præst
Klaus Nielsen as Gårdskarlen Anton
Ib Glindemann as Trumpetplayer in band (uncredited)

References

External links

1964 films
Danish children's films
1960s Danish-language films
Films set in castles